The Man Who Crossed Hitler is a 2011 BBC film set in Berlin in the summer of 1931, dramatising the true story in which a lawyer, Hans Litten, subpoenaed Adolf Hitler as a witness in the trial of some Nazi thugs. Hitler has formally renounced the use of political violence and the young lawyer sees a chance to expose the Nazi leader's deceptions to the German establishment, thereby discrediting Hitler and the Nazi Party. The film was given an alternative title Hitler on Trial which was used when the Public Broadcasting Service in the United States aired the work.

Cast
The cast included:
 Ed Stoppard as Hans Litten
 Ian Hart as Adolf Hitler
 Bill Paterson as Kurt Ohnesorge
 Sarah Smart as Margot Fürst
 Anton Lesser as Rudolf Olden
 Ronan Vibert as Walther Stennes
 Chris Simpson as Brownshirt

References

External links
 

2011 television films
2011 films
2011 drama films
BBC television dramas
Drama films based on actual events
Films directed by Justin Hardy
Films set in 1931
Films set in Berlin
2010s British films
British drama television films